Thomas Limpinsel is a German actor, known best for his role as Heinz Linge in Downfall.

Life 
Thomas Limpinsel studied acting in 1987 at the Hochschule für Musik, Theater und Medien Hannover. After his studies, he was initially engaged at the Lower Saxony State Theatre, had a guest engagement at the Stadttheater Hildesheim and in 1993 followed the director Eberhard Witt to the Bayerische Staatsschauspiel München, where he worked until 1997.

Since 1997, Limpinsel worked as a freelance Schauspieler and had guest engagements at the Bavarian State Theatre, Schauspielhaus Bochum, Burgtheater in Vienna, the Salzburg Festival, as well as the Komischen Oper, and the Renaissancetheater, along with the Schlossparktheater in Berlin.

Along with his theatre work, Thomas Limpinsel is present in many film and TV productions. This includes his role as Heinz Linge, the valet for Adolf Hitler, in the Oscar-nominated Bernd Eichinger film Downfall, die Sat1 Comedy Paare (which got nominated for an Emmy), the TV series Unser Lehrer Doktor Specht, the 2012 TV film Rommel, and in many episodes of the crime series Tatort.

Thomas Limpinsel speaks German along with fluent English and French.

Selected filmography 

1992: Unser Lehrer Doktor Specht (TV Series) - Drogendealer
1995: Der Trip
1997: Sketchup – The Next Generation (TV Series)
1999: Hotel Elfie (TV Series) - Bernd Bosch
2001-2018: Tatort (TV Series) - Gerd Schneider / Ludwig Wahlberg / Sven, Drogenpolizist / Johann Knauf / Tom Odetzki
2002-2005: Schulmädchen (TV Series) - Paul Heller
2004: Der Untergang - Heinz Linge
2004:  - Mann vorm Fernseher
2004-2008: Um Himmels Willen (TV Series) - Max Bachmann
2005: Der Bulle von Tölz (TV Series) - Paul Heller
2005-2015: Die Rosenheim-Cops (TV Series) - Frederik Pradler / Eberhard Weinberger / Robert Thoma / Ludwig Mosch
2006: Shoppen - Egon
2006: Kommissar Stolberg (TV Series) - Dr. Ulrich Jansen
2008: Der Kaiser von Schexing
2008: Geliebte Clara (German version) - Tausch (voice)
2009: Tod aus der Tiefe (TV Movie) - Holger Schneider
2010: Hinter blinden Fenstern (TV Movie) - Dr. Justus Dornkam
2010: Der letzte Bulle (TV Series) - Arne Pohl
2010:  - Mathis
2011:  (TV Movie) - Frido Kerkhoff
2011: Kann denn Liebe Sünde sein? (TV Movie) - Paul
2011: Die Muse - Fischer
2012: Rommel (TV Movie) - Horst
2012-2017: Hubert ohne Staller (TV Series) - Gerd Kessler / Dominik Lorenz
2012-2021: Katie Fforde - Janosch Wieler / Paul Schulz / Jason Cornway / Michael Bollack
2013: Ruby Red - Mr. Southfolk 1912
2013: München Mord (TV Series) - Gustav Bernlocher
2014: Sieben Tage ohne (TV Movie) - Frido Kerkhoff
2014: Unter Verdacht (TV Series) - Hortinger
2014: Monsoon Baby (TV Movie) - Dominik Volkert
2014: Hirngespinster - Polizist Autobahnbrücke
2014-2019: Rosamunde Pilcher (TV Series) - Hugh Crankshaw / Winston Holmes
2015: Die Dienstagsfrauen – Zwischen Kraut und Rüben (TV Movie)
2015: Heldt (TV Series) - Günter Rositzki
2015: Wilsberg (TV Series) - Labuske
2015: Abschussfahrt - Helmut
2015: Süßer September (TV Movie) - Johann
2015: Über den Tag hinaus (TV Movie) - Michael
2015: Die Maßnahme - Behringer
2015: Notruf Hafenkante (TV Series) - Rainer Dorfmann
2016: The Most Beautiful Day - Sicherheitsmann Flughafen
2016: In aller Freundschaft – Die jungen Ärzte (TV Series) - Theodor Kelster
2016-2019: Der Lehrer (TV Series) - Thorsten Dehler
2017: Mord in bester Gesellschaft (TV Series) - Pathologe
2017: Ein Kind wird gesucht (TV Movie) - Pastor
2017: Nur Gott kann mich richten - Dienstgruppenleiter
2017-2018: Hubert ohne Staller (TV Series) - Gerd Kessler / Dominik Lorenz
2018: Wackersdorf - Gegenfurtner
2018: Heiter bis tödlich: Morden im Norden (TV Series) - Frank Schneider
2019: Gipfelstürmer – Das Berginternat (TV Series) - Dr. Gregor Berz
2019: The Collini Case - Forensic Pathologist
2019: Nimm Du ihn (TV Movie) - Brokopp
2021: Faltenfrei - Georg

Theatre 

 Salzburg Festival in Jedermann as "Dünner Vetter" (2007 to 2012)
 Salzburg Festival in Jedermann for a person (2008)

References

External links 

 
 Agent Page

1965 births
German male stage actors
German male film actors
Living people